Omicron Capricorni (ο Capricorni) is a wide binary star system in the constellation Capricornus. The brighter component has an apparent visual magnitude of +5.94, which is near the lower limit on stellar brightness that still can be seen with the naked eye. Based upon an annual parallax shift of 15.07 mas as seen from Earth, this system is located roughly 220 light-years from the Sun. Large but uncertain discrepancies in the parallax measurements from Hipparcos may indicate, weakly, that there is a third, unseen companion in the system.

Both visible components are white-hued A-type main-sequence stars. The primary, component A, sometimes called ο1 Capricorni, has an apparent magnitude of +5.94, while the companion, component B or ο2 Capricorni, has an apparent magnitude of +6.74. At the estimated age of around 118 million years old, both components are spinning rapidly: component A has a projected rotational velocity of 276 km/s, while component B is 136 km/s.

References

A-type main-sequence stars
Binary stars
Capricorni, Omicron
Capricornus (constellation)
Durchmusterung objects
Capricorni, 12
195093 4
101120 3
7829 30